The Malady of Love is a 1986 Italian-French romantic drama film directed by Giorgio Treves. For this film Treves won the David di Donatello for Best New Director.

Cast 
 Robin Renucci : Robert Briand
 Isabelle Pasco : Marte-Blanche
 Piera Degli Esposti : Thérèse
 Erland Josephson : Robert's Father
 Carole Bouquet : Eleonore
 Paolo Rossi :  Laurent
 Franco Citti : Cigal
 Andrzej Seweryn : The Pedlar 
 Gianfranco Barra

References

External links

1986 films
1986 romantic drama films
Italian romantic drama films
French romantic drama films
Films with screenplays by Vincenzo Cerami
1986 directorial debut films
1980s Italian films
1980s French films